A cutbow (Oncorhynchus clarkii × mykiss) is an interspecific fertile hybrid between a rainbow trout (Oncorhynchus mykiss) and a cutthroat trout (O. clarkii). Cutbow hybrids may occur naturally where the native ranges of both species overlap, such as between coastal rainbow trout (O. mykiss irideus) and coastal cutthroat trout (O. clarkii clarkii) and between Columbia River redband trout (O. mykiss gardineri) and westslope cutthroat trout (O. clarkii lewisi). While natural separation of spawning habitat limited hybridization in most native populations of rainbows and cutthroats, introduction of non-native hatchery-raised rainbow trout into the native ranges of cutthroat subspecies increased the rate of hybridization. Some native cutthroat populations are, as a result, at risk due to genetic pollution.

About
In the 1880s, rainbow trout were stocked in a number of different waters that already had cutthroat trout in them. Shortly after, cutbows were prominent in these waters. Cutbows are created when the female cutthroat trout's eggs are fertilized by a bigger male rainbow trout. Many fishermen get the cutbow confused with the rainbow and cutthroat trout. The cutbow has red or orange slash markings under the jaw and a silver body. Though most cutbow have dots on their bodies, patterns vary between each fish.

Cutbows spawn during spring and prefer temperatures between 40 and 50°F. They are able to reproduce in natural habitats and in hatcheries.  They are almost immune to whirling disease, which affects most trout in Colorado.

References

External links
 http://precedings.nature.com/documents/6432/version/1/files/npre20116432-1.pdf
 https://nas.er.usgs.gov/queries/factsheet.aspx?SpeciesID=904
 http://docs.streamnetlibrary.org/CoastalCutthroatData/sn600255.pdf
 http://www.spokesman.com/blogs/outdoors/2011/aug/02/record-idaho-trout-was-hybrid/
 https://web.archive.org/web/20100529221503/http://www.isu.edu/~keelerne/cuttpage/SFSR.htm
 https://web.archive.org/web/20100621054717/http://nhguide.dbs.umt.edu/index.php?c=fish&m=desc&id=7
 https://web.archive.org/web/20101128091813/https://research.idfg.idaho.gov/Fisheries%20Research%20Reports/Res-Rohrer1986%20Evaluation%20of%20Two%20Hybrid%20Trout%20Strains%20in%20Henrys%20Lake%20and%20Comments%20on%20Potential%20Use%20of%20Sterile%20Triploid.pdf
 :File:CutbowGardnerRiverYNP.jpg
 http://www.henryslakefoundation.com/hybridtrout.php
 https://web.archive.org/web/20120616173509/http://wildlife.state.co.us/SiteCollectionDocuments/DOW/Fishing/FisheryWaterSummaries/Summaries/Northeast/Elevenmile2010.pdf
 https://web.archive.org/web/20120526123049/http://wildlife.state.co.us/SiteCollectionDocuments/DOW/Fishing/FisheryWaterSummaries/Summaries/Northeast/Antero2011%20.pdf
 http://wildlife.state.co.us/SiteCollectionDocuments/DOW/Fishing/FisheryWaterSummaries/Summaries/Southeast/TwinLakesRes2-18-11.pdf
 https://web.archive.org/web/20120824190128/http://wildlife.state.co.us/SiteCollectionDocuments/DOW/Fishing/FisheryWaterSummaries/Summaries/Northeast/DepoortersLake.pdf
 https://web.archive.org/web/20120824190755/http://wildlife.state.co.us/SiteCollectionDocuments/DOW/Fishing/FisheryWaterSummaries/Summaries/Southeast/DeWeeseReservoir.pdf
 https://web.archive.org/web/20120824190723/http://wildlife.state.co.us/SiteCollectionDocuments/DOW/Fishing/FisheryWaterSummaries/Summaries/Northeast/JumboReservoir.pdf
 http://wildlife.state.co.us/SiteCollectionDocuments/DOW/Fishing/FisheryWaterSummaries/Summaries/Northeast/AkronPond_2011_MB.pdf
 https://web.archive.org/web/20120227125024/http://wildlife.state.co.us/SiteCollectionDocuments/DOW/Fishing/FisheryWaterSummaries/Summaries/Southeast/MartinLake.pdf
 http://wildlife.state.co.us/SiteCollectionDocuments/DOW/Fishing/FisheryWaterSummaries/Summaries/Northeast/JacksonReservoir_2011_MB.pdf
 http://wildlife.state.co.us/SiteCollectionDocuments/DOW/Fishing/FisheryWaterSummaries/Summaries/Southeast/Pueblo2011.pdf
 https://web.archive.org/web/20120824201959/http://wildlife.state.co.us/SiteCollectionDocuments/DOW/Fishing/FisheryWaterSummaries/Summaries/Northeast/ClearCreek.pdf
 http://wildlife.state.co.us/SiteCollectionDocuments/DOW/Fishing/FisheryWaterSummaries/Summaries/Northeast/SouthDelaney10.pdf
 http://wildlife.state.co.us/SiteCollectionDocuments/DOW/Fishing/FisheryWaterSummaries/Summaries/Southeast/Runyon2011.pdf
 https://web.archive.org/web/20120329134649/http://wildlife.state.co.us/SiteCollectionDocuments/DOW/Fishing/FisheryWaterSummaries/Summaries/Northeast/PrewittReservoir_2011_MB.pdf

Oncorhynchus
Fish hybrids